Jaroslav Pospíšil was the defending champion but lost in the quarterfinals to eventual champion Iñigo Cervantes-Huegun. Spanish qualifier won in the final 6–4, 7–6(7–3), against Pavol Červenák.

Seeds

Draw

Finals

Top half

Bottom half

References
 Main Draw
 Qualifying Draw

ATP Challenger Trophy - Singles
2011 Singles